The extreme points of the Faroe Islands include the coordinates that are further north, south, east or west than any other location in the Faroe Islands; and the highest and the lowest elevations in the territory.

The latitude and longitude are expressed in decimal degree notation, in which a positive latitude value refers to the northern hemisphere, and a negative value refers to the southern hemisphere. Similarly, a positive longitude value refers to the eastern hemisphere, and a negative value refers to the western hemisphere. The coordinates used in this article are sourced from Google Earth, which makes use of the World Geodetic System (WGS) 84, a geodetic reference system.

Latitude and longitude

Altitude

See also
 Extreme points of Earth
 Extreme points of Europe
 Extreme points of Denmark
 Geography of the Faroe Islands

Notes

References

Geography of the Faroe Islands
Faroe Islands